Preeceville is a town in Saskatchewan, Canada. The town is 10 km (6 miles) west of Sturgis and 99 km (62 miles) north of Yorkton at the junction of Highway 49, Highway 47, Highway 9 and near Highway 755.

Demographics 

Transportation
The community is served by Preeceville Airport which is located 1 nautical mile (1.9 km) southeast.

See also
 List of communities in Saskatchewan
 List of towns in Saskatchewan

References

Towns in Saskatchewan
Division No. 9, Saskatchewan